Wei Dingguo is a fictional character in Water Margin, one of the Four Great Classical Novels in Chinese literature. Nicknamed "General of Holy Fire", he ranks 45th among the 108 Stars of Destiny and ninth among the 72 Earthly Fiends.

Background
A military instructor in his hometown Lingzhou (凌州; in present-day Dezhou, Shandong) alongside Shan Tinggui, Wei Dingguo is a tough warrior who rides a red steed and fights with a long sabre. He dons a suit of red armour and a helmet topped with a red feather when he goes into a battle.  He is best known for the use of flaming substances in attacks, aided by five hundred soldiers trained in the technique. For this skill in setting his foes on fire, he is nicknamed "General of Holy Fire".

Becoming an outlaw
Guan Sheng volunteers to take the fight to Lingzhou when Liangshan learns that Wei Dingguo and Shan Tingguo have been appointed by the Song court to eliminate them following their successful rescue of Lu Junyi in Daming which involved a city-wide rampage. The two instructors are recommended to Emperor Huizong by Grand Tutor Cai Jing.

In the first battle outside Lingzhou, Guan Sheng is rattled by the capture of his two lieutenants Xuan Zan and Hao Siwen by Wei Dingguo and Shan Tingguo. Xuan has been lured to ride into the ranks of Wei's soldiers, who quickly encircled and seized him. 

Meanwhile, Li Kui has sneaked out of Liangshan after being forbidden by Song Jiang to join Guan Sheng in the attack on Lingzhou. He befriends Jiao Ting while on his way, who takes him to Bao Xu, who leads a bandit group at Mount Deadwood. While with Bao, they rescue Xuan Zan and Hao Siwen as the convoy escorting them to Dongjing for punishment passes Mount Deadwood. 

At Lingzhou, the battle continues with Guan Sheng fighting Shan Tinggui one-on-one on horseback. Then Guan lures Shan to chase after him till they reach a remote spot where he turns and swings his big sabre to whack the latter off his horse. Instead of moving in to kill, Guan gets off his horse and shows Shan kind treatment, winning over the man.  

Left standing alone, Wei Dingguo injures many of Guan's soldiers when his men unleash on them combustible materials such as sulphur. Just then, Li Kui, assisted by Jiao Ting, Bao Xu, Xuan Zan and Hao Siwen, attacks a gate of Lingzhou, causing the city to fall, when Wei is still outside of it. Wei flees to a nearby county and is determined to make his last stand there. Knowing that Wei would rather die than be humiliated, Shan Tinggui goes alone into the county to promise him dignified treatment if he gives in. But Wei insists that Guan Sheng come personally and unaccompanied to show sincerity. Guan obliges, thus convincing Wei to join Liangshan.

Campaigns and death
Wei Dingguo is appointed as one of the leaders of the Liangshan cavalry after the 108 Stars of Destiny come together in what is called the Grand Assembly. He participates in the campaigns against the Liao invaders and rebel forces in Song territory following amnesty from Emperor Huizong for Liangshan.

In the campaign against Fang La, Wei Dingguo and Shan Tinggui assist Lu Junyi in taking Xuanzhou (宣州; present-day Xuancheng, Anhui) and Huzhou. They are later assigned to lead the attack on Shezhou, where they are lured into the finding its gate open and no one barring the way. Falling into a concealed pit, they are killed by soldiers waiting in ambush.

References
 
 
 
 
 
 
 

72 Earthly Fiends
Fictional characters from Shandong